Colby Fainga'a (born 31 March 1991) is an Australian professional rugby union player who plays for Lyon in the Top 14.

Career

ACT Brumbies
Fainga'a made his Super Rugby debut for the Brumbies in 2010 against the Chiefs in Canberra.

Melbourne Rebels
On 7 August 2015, Fainga'a, along with Scott Fuglistaller were appointed co-captains of Melbourne Rising for the 2015 National Rugby Championship season.

Connacht
On 11 July 2018 Connacht announced the signing of Fainga'a, it was stated he would join up with the squad on the conclusion of the current Rebels Super Rugby season. Connacht Head Coach Andy Friend had previously coached him at former club Brumbies when he signed his first professional contract with the club.

Lyon
In 2020, Fainga'a would travel to France to join Lyon in the Top 14 from the 2020–21 season.

Relatives
He is the younger brother of twins Saia & Anthony Fainga'a and also Vili Fainga'a.

Super Rugby statistics

References

External links
Melbourne Rebels Profile

1991 births
Australian rugby union players
Indigenous Australian rugby union players
Australian sportspeople of Tongan descent
ACT Brumbies players
Rugby union flankers
Living people
Melbourne Rebels players
Melbourne Rising players
Connacht Rugby players
People from Queanbeyan
Australian expatriate rugby union players
Expatriate rugby union players in Ireland
Expatriate rugby union players in France
Lyon OU players
Rugby union players from New South Wales
Kyuden Voltex players
Expatriate rugby union players in Japan